LCMT1 may refer to:
 Leucine carboxyl methyltransferase 1
 (Phosphatase 2A protein)-leucine-carboxy methyltransferase